Joaquim de Magalhães Fernandes Barreiros (born June 19, 1947, in Vila Praia de Âncora, Portugal), known professionally as Quim Barreiros, is a Portuguese Pimba music writer,singer and accordion player, more known for his double entendre songs. Among his biggest hits are Bacalhau à Portuguesa [Portuguese Style Cod] (1986), A Garagem da Vizinha [The Neighbour's Garage] (2000) and A Cabritinha [The Little Goat] (2004).

He started his career before Emanuel, being one of the first, if not the actual first, documented case of pimba.

Biography 
Quim Barreiros was born on June 19, 1947, in Vila Praia de Âncora, municipality of Caminha, Viana do Castelo District, to a Portuguese mother and a Brazilian father.

When he was 9 years old, he started playing the drums in his father's band (Conjunto Alegria), after some years he started playing the accordion along with his father, until he joined a folklore group called Sta. Marta de Portuzelo and started touring around Portugal and some nearby countries like Spain and France, which allowed Quim to meet lots of folklore artists from different regions and with different styles.

When he was 20 years old, he had to undergo mandatory military service in Lisbon, and then joined the Portuguese Air Force, as well as the Air Force's band. His involvement with the Air Force band also meant that Quim wouldn't get sent to the wars on the Portuguese colonies.

In the day Quim dealt with his military duties, at night he started attending Casas de Fado (Houses of Fado), places where you can have a meal while listening to Fado classics, and eventually started having concerts in these houses. Quim's music contrasted with the serenity and sternness of Fado, but was well received.

In 1971, Quim releases his first LP Quim Barreiros – Acordeão , then in 1974 he released his second LP Quim Barreiros – Povo Que Canta. These were composed mostly of Portuguese folklore classics. After these, Quim started writing his own songs and developing his spicy, double meaning lyricism.

Quim then toured several countries that have Portuguese emigrant communities such as the United States, Canada, France, Germany and more.

In the meantime he continued releasing some albums and compilations full of funny scenarios and double meaning, eventually becoming one of the most loved Portuguese musicians at the time.

His music reached both the old and the young demographic, and in the middle of the 80's, he started performing at student association parties such as Queima das Fitas, Academic Week and freshman receptions, a tradition maintained alive to this day.

Discography 
1971 - Quim Barreiros Acordeão
1973 - Recebi um Convite
1975 - O Malhão Não É Reaccionário
1981 - Dance Com Quim Barreiros e o Super-Trio
1986 - Bacalhau à Portuguesa
1986 - Riacho da Pedreira
1991 - CD D'Ouro
1992 - O Sorveteiro (Chupa Teresa)
1992 - Original (O Franguito da Maria)
1993 - Insónia
1993 - Deixa Botar Só a Cabeça (Acredita em Mim)
1994 - Meu Dinossauro
1994 - Mestre da Culinária
1994 - Os 60 Maiores Êxitos
1995 - Nunca Gastes Tudo
1996 - Minha Vaca Louca/Melhor Dia Para Casar
1997 - 15 Grandes Sucessos
1998 - Marcha da Expo'98 (A Última do Milénio)
1998 - Na Internet
1998 - O Melhor dos Melhores
1999 - Marcha do 3º Milénio
2000 - A Garagem da Vizinha
2001 - Comer, Comer
2002 - Depois da Uma
2002 - Cantares ao Desafio
2003 - O Melhor de Quim Barreiros
2003 - Na Tua Casa Tá Entrando Outro Macho
2004 - A Cabritinha
2004 - O Melhor de Quim Barreiros, Vol. 2
2005 - Riacho da Pedreira
2005 - O Ténis
2006 - DVD - Quim Barreiros Live
2006 - A Padaria
2007 - Use Álcool
2008 - Fui Acudir
2008 - O Melhor de Quim Barreiros, Vol. 3
2009 - O Peixe
2010 - Deixai-me Chutar
2011 - O Brioche da Sofia
2012 - Dar ao Apito
2013 - Mole Não Entra
2014 - Caça-Asneiras
2015 - O Pau Caiu na Panela
2016 - Eu Faço 69
2017 - O Zinho
2018 - O Meu Refogado
2019 - Amélia Costureira
2020 - Será Porca ou Parafuso?

References

External links 
 

1947 births
Living people
Pimba music
20th-century Portuguese male singers
21st-century Portuguese male singers
Portuguese people of Brazilian descent